"Cheek to Cheek" is a song written by Irving Berlin in 1935.

Cheek to Cheek may also refer to:

Film and TV
"Cheek to Cheek" (St. Elsewhere), 1986

Music

Albums
Cheek to Cheek (album), 2014 album by Tony Bennett and Lady Gaga
Cheek to Cheek, 2006 album by Beegie Adair
Cheek to Cheek, 2009 album by Lisa Ono
Cheek to Cheek, 2011 album by Barbara Cook and Michael Feinstein
Cheek to Cheek: The Complete Duet Recordings, 2018 album by Ella Fitzgerald and Louis Armstrong

Songs
 Cheek to Cheek, 2007 song by Sahara Hotnights

Culture
Cheek kissing may involve cheek-to-cheek contact

See also
Cheek (disambiguation)